Belmont may refer to:

People
 Belmont (surname)

Places
 Belmont Abbey (disambiguation)
 Belmont Historic District (disambiguation)
 Belmont Hotel (disambiguation)
 Belmont Park (disambiguation)
 Belmont Plantation (disambiguation)
 Belmont railway station (disambiguation)
 Belmont Street (disambiguation)

Antigua and Barbuda
 Belmont, Antigua and Barbuda

Australia
 Belmont, New South Wales, a suburb in the Hunter Region
 Belmont, Queensland, an outer suburb of Brisbane
 Shire of Belmont, Queensland, a former local government area
 Electoral district of Belmont (Queensland), a former state electorate in the Legislative Assembly of Queensland
 Belmont, Victoria, a southern suburb of Geelong
 Belmont, Western Australia, a suburb of Perth
 City of Belmont, a Local Government Area in Western Australia, in the inner eastern suburbs of Perth
 Electoral district of Belmont, a state electorate represented in the Western Australian Legislative Assembly

Canada
 Belmont, Edmonton, Alberta
 Belmont, Nova Scotia
 Belmont, Ontario
 Belmont, Prince Edward Island
 Port Belmont (aka "Belmont"), British Columbia, a former mining community on Princess Royal Island
 Havelock-Belmont-Methuen, Ontario

France 
 Belmont, Bas-Rhin
 Belmont, Doubs
 Belmont, Gers
 Belmont, Isère
 Belmont, Haute-Marne
 Belmont, Haute-Saône
 Belmont, Jura

Grenada
 Belmont, Grenada

Ireland
 Belmont, County Offaly

Israel 
 Belmont Castle, a Crusader castle ruins near Suba, Jerusalem

Lithuania
 Belmontas, originally Belmont, a suburb of Vilnius

New Zealand
 Belmont, Auckland
 Belmont, Wellington

Switzerland
 Belmont Castle, Graubünden
 Belmont-sur-Lausanne, Vaud
 Belmont-sur-Yverdon, Vaud

Trinidad and Tobago
 Belmont, Port of Spain

United Kingdom

England 
 Belmont, County Durham, now part of Durham city
 Belmont, Lyme Regis, a Grade II* listed country house in Dorset
 Belmont, East Sussex
 Belmont, Lancashire
 Belmont, East Barnet, a former house in London
 Belmont, Harrow, North London
 Belmont, Sutton, South London
 Belmont Castle, a demolished mansion near Grays, Essex
 Belmont House and Gardens, Kent
 Belmont Rural, Herefordshire
 Belmont transmitting station, Lincolnshire

Northern Ireland 
 Belmont, Belfast, an electoral ward

Scotland 
 Belmont, Ayr
 Belmont, Shetland

United States

Arizona

Arkansas 
 Belmont, Arkansas

California 
 Belmont, California

Georgia 
 Belmont, Georgia

Illinois 
 Belmont Avenue (Chicago)
 Belmont, Illinois
 Belmont Township, Iroquois County, Illinois

Indiana 
 Belmont, Indiana

Kentucky 
 Belmont, Bracken County, Kentucky
 Belmont, Bullitt County, Kentucky

Maine 
 Belmont, Maine

Maryland 
 Belmont (Chevy Chase, Maryland Subdivision)

Massachusetts 
 Belmont, Massachusetts

Michigan 
 Belmont, Michigan

Minnesota 
 Belmont Township, Jackson County, Minnesota

Mississippi 
 Belmont, Mississippi
 Belmont Plantation (Wayside, Mississippi)

Missouri 
 Belmont, Missouri, site of the Civil War Battle of Belmont

Nebraska 
 Belmont, Nebraska, a ghost town

Nevada 
 Belmont, Nevada, a ghost town

New Hampshire 
 Belmont, New Hampshire, a town
 Belmont (CDP), New Hampshire, a village and census-designated place in the town

New York 
 Belmont, New York, a village in Allegany County
 Belmont, Bronx, New York, a neighborhood in New York City

North Carolina 
 Belmont, North Carolina

Ohio 
 Belmont, Ohio
 Belmont County, Ohio

Oregon 
 Belmont, Portland, Oregon

Pennsylvania 
 Belmont, Pennsylvania
 Belmont (Bensalem, Pennsylvania)
 Belmont District, Pennsylvania
 Belmont Mansion (Philadelphia)

Tennessee 
 Belmont, Anderson County, Tennessee
 Belmont, Coffee County, Tennessee
 Belmont, Jefferson County, Tennessee
 Belmont Mansion (Tennessee)

Texas 
 Belmont, Texas, in Gonzales County
 Belmont, Dallas

Vermont 
 Belmont, Vermont

Virginia 
 Belmont Plantation (Albemarle County, Virginia)
 Belmont (Capron, Virginia)
 Belmont (Charlottesville, Virginia)
 Belmont (Falmouth, Virginia), now known as Gari Melchers Home & Studio
 Belmont, Virginia, in Loudoun County
 Belmont, Montgomery County, Virginia
 Belmont, Roanoke, Virginia
 Belmont Manor House, Ashburn, Virginia

Washington 
 Belmont, Washington

West Virginia 
 Belmont, West Virginia

Wisconsin 
 Belmont, Wisconsin, a village in Lafayette County
 Belmont (town), Wisconsin, a town in Lafayette County
 Belmont, Portage County, Wisconsin, a town

Zimbabwe
 Belmont, Zimbabwe, site of Ingutsheni Hospital

Automobiles
 Belmont (automobile), an American electric car sold in 1916
 Holden Belmont, an Australian car sold from 1968 to 1974
 Vauxhall Belmont, a British car sold from 1986 to 1991

Fiction 
 Belmont, fictional Italian estate of the character Portia in the  play The Merchant of Venice by William Shakespeare
 The Belmonts, a clan of vampire-hunting characters in the Japanese video game series Castlevania
 Brago and Sherry Belmont, characters in the Japanese manga series Zatch Bell!

Music 
 Belmont (band), an American pop punk band
 Belmont (album)
 Belmont Prize, a German music award

Schools
 Belmont Abbey College, North Carolina, United States
 Belmont Academy, Ayr, Scotland
 Belmont College, Ohio, United States
 Belmont Elementary School, British Columbia, Canada
 Belmont Preparatory High School, New York, United States
 Belmont Public Schools, Belmont, Massachusetts
 Belmont School (disambiguation), several schools
 Belmont Secondary School, British Columbia, Canada
 Belmont University, Tennessee, United States

Sport
 Belmont Stakes, a horse race
 Belmont Bombers, a junior ice hockey team in Belmont, Ontario, Canada
 Belmont Bruins, the sports teams of Belmont University in Nashville, Tennessee, United States
 Belmont Shore RFC, a rugby union team in Long Beach, California, United States

Other uses
 Battle of Belmont (1899), during the Second Boer War
 Battle of Belmont (1861), during the American Civil War
 Belmont (cigarette), a Canadian brand
 Belmont Books, a publishing company
 Belmont Report, a medical ethics report
 Lake Macquarie Airport, formerly Belmont Airport
 Belmont transmitting station in Lincolnshire

See also
 Balmont (disambiguation)
 Beaumont (disambiguation)
 Bellmont (disambiguation)
 Belmond, Iowa
 Belmonte (disambiguation)
 Earl of Bellomont
 Montebello (disambiguation)
 Schönberg (disambiguation) (German for "beautiful mountain")